The second season of the reimagined science fiction television series Battlestar Galactica premiered on the Sci-Fi Channel in the United States on July 15, 2005, and concluded on March 10, 2006. The season was split into two parts, each containing 10 episodes. "Season 2.0" aired from July to September 2005, and "Season 2.5" aired from January to March 2006.

Cast and characters

Main cast
 Edward James Olmos as William Adama
 Mary McDonnell as Laura Roslin
 Katee Sackhoff as Kara "Starbuck" Thrace
 Jamie Bamber as Lee "Apollo" Adama
 James Callis as Gaius Baltar
 Tricia Helfer as Number Six
 Grace Park as Sharon "Boomer" Valerii (Number Eight)
 Michael Hogan as Saul Tigh
 Aaron Douglas as Galen Tyrol
 Tahmoh Penikett as Karl "Helo" Agathon
 Nicki Clyne as Cally Henderson
 Kandyse McClure as Anastasia Dualla
 Paul Campbell as Billy Keikeya
 Alessandro Juliani as Felix Gaeta

Recurring cast
 Sam Witwer as Alex "Crashdown" Quartararo
 Donnelly Rhodes as Sherman Cottle
 Rekha Sharma as Tory Foster
 Callum Keith Rennie as Leoben Conoy (Number Two)
 Lucy Lawless as D'Anna Biers (Number Three)
 Matthew Bennett as Aaron Doral (Number Five)
 Dean Stockwell as John Cavil (Number One)
 Rick Worthy as Simon (Number Four)
 Richard Hatch as Tom Zarek
 Kate Vernon as Ellen Tigh
 Lorena Gale as Elosha
 Michael Trucco as Samuel Anders
 Michelle Forbes as Helena Cain
 Graham Beckel as Jack Fisk
 Leah Cairns as Margaret "Racetrack" Edmondson
 Bodie Olmos as Brendan "Hot Dog" Costanza
 Luciana Carro as Louanne "Kat" Katraine
 Alonso Oyarzun as Socinus
 Jennifer Halley as Diana "Hardball" Seelix

Episodes

Production and reception
Following the success of the 13-episode first season, the Sci-Fi Channel ordered a 20-episode second season on February 23, 2005. The season premiered in the United States on the Sci-Fi Channel on July 15, 2005, with the UK, Ireland, and Canadian premiere in January 2006. In fall 2005, airing of the second season halted, as it was part of Sci-Fi Channel's standard airing schedule normally used for its Stargate series, which was to split a 20-episode season into two parts (a "winter season" and a "summer season") to avoid heavy competition with major networks that follow a spring/fall schedule. Universal Home Video took this break as an opportunity to package the episodes aired thus far into a DVD set, calling it "Season 2.0". The final episode of the first half, "Pegasus", was originally 15 minutes too long for broadcast, but according to creator Ronald Moore, the production team decided to cut the episode to time rather than pad it out to fill 90 minutes, as this was deemed impractical. The longer version of "Pegasus" appears on the Battlestar Galactica Season 2.5 DVD set, which was released in the U.S. on September 19, 2006. Sky did not contribute financially to the second season, though UK broadcasts credit the company at the end of every episode.

The second half of season two ("Season 2.5") began airing on January 6, 2006, after a three-month hiatus, during which the Sci-Fi Channel mounted a huge publicity effort. Battlestar Galactica picked up considerable critical acclaim from the mainstream press, including being named the #1 show of 2005 by Time magazine, and being listed on numerous top ten lists of both 2005 and 2006 by publications such as the Chicago Tribune, Entertainment Weekly, Newsday and TV Guide. The American Film Institute also named it one of the ten best television shows of 2005. There was some criticism that a few episodes following "Resurrection Ship, Part 2" were not up to par with previous episodes, such as the episode "Black Market", for which even Ron Moore expressed some disdain. Moore stated in his blog that he felt this was a result of the larger workload the series faced with twenty episodes, instead of thirteen in season one. However, episode 15, "Scar", was thought to bring the series back up to its high level of quality, and subsequent episodes "The Captain's Hand", "Downloaded", and the two part finale "Lay Down Your Burdens", were hailed by fans and critics alike. Moore expressed that the longer break between seasons two and three (seven months instead of two) would help to ensure that all episodes were up to the high level of quality that the production team strove to maintain.

Reception

Critical response
On Rotten Tomatoes, the season has an approval rating of 100% with an average score of 9.5 out of 10 based on 12 reviews. The website's critical consensus reads, "In its second season, Battlestar Galatica doubles down on the series' high-minded themes and satisfyingly complex storylines."

Awards
Wins
 2005 Saturn Award for Best Syndicated/Cable Television Series
 2005 Saturn Award for Best Supporting Actor on Television – James Callis
 2005 Saturn Award for Best Supporting Actress on Television – Katee Sackhoff
 2006 Scream Award for Best Television Show
 2006 Spacey Awards for Best Television Show
 2005 Visual Effects Society Award for Outstanding Animated Character in a Live Action Broadcast Program, Commercial, or Music Video (Cylon Centurion in "Fragged")

Nominations
 2006 ALMA Award for Outstanding Actor in a Television Series – Edward James Olmos
 2006 Emmy Award for Outstanding Special Visual Effects for a Series ("Resurrection Ship, Part 2")
 2006 Emmy Award for Outstanding Costumes for a Series ("Lay Down Your Burdens, Part 2")
 2006 Emmy Award for Outstanding Single-Camera Sound Mixing for a Series ("Scattered")
 2006 Hugo Award for Best Dramatic Presentation, Short Form ("Pegasus")
 2005 Saturn Award for Best Supporting Actor on Television – Jamie Bamber
 2005 Saturn Award for Best Television Release on DVD (Season 2.0)
 2005 Visual Effects Society Award for Outstanding Animated Character in a Live Action Broadcast Program, Commercial, or Music Video (Cylon in "Valley of Darkness")

Home video releases
Season 2.0 and 2.5 were released on DVD in region 1 on December 20, 2005, and September 19, 2006, respectively. The complete second season was released on Blu-ray Disc in region 1 on April 6, 2010. The complete second season was released on DVD in region 2 on August 28, 2006 and in region 4 on April 4, 2007.

The Season 2.0 DVD set includes the first 10 episodes of season two. Special features on the set include creator Ronald D. Moore's podcast commentaries for 7 of the 10 episodes; a podcast for "Fragged" was not recorded, while the podcasts for "Flight of the Phoenix" and "Pegasus" were not recorded in time for the DVDs, but are available on the official website. Also included are deleted scenes for 9 episodes and a sneak peek promo for the second half of the season. The Season 2.5 DVD set includes the last 10 episodes of season two, plus the extended hour-long version of "Pegasus". Special features include Moore's podcast commentaries for all 10 episodes; he is joined by writers David Weddle and Bradley Thompson on "Scar", his wife Terry Dresbach on "Lay Down Your Burdens, Part 1" and executive producer David Eick on "Lay Down Your Burdens, Part 2". Moore and Eick provide audio commentary for the extended version of "Pegasus", a commentary specifically produced for the DVD. Also included are deleted scenes for 8 episodes, 7 of David Eick's videoblogs, and a collection of the R&D logos that appear at the end of each episode.

Soundtrack

References

External links
 
 

2
2005 American television seasons
2006 American television seasons
Split television seasons